Predrag Palavestra (14 June 1930 – 19 August 2014) was a Serbian author and academic.

Works
 Književne teme (1958)
 Književnost Mlade Bosne (1965)
 Tokovi tradicije (1971)
 Posleratna srpska književnost 1945—1970 (1972)
 Dogma i utopija Dimitrija Mitrinovića: počeci srpske književne avangarde (1977)
 Kritika i avangarda u modernoj srpskoj književnosti (1979)
 Skriveni pesnik: Ivo Andrić (1981)
 Kritička književnost (1983)
 Nasleđe srpskog modernizma (1985)
 Istorija moderne srpske književnosti — zlatno doba 1892-1918. (1986)
 Književnost kao kritika ideologije (1991)
 Knjiga o Andriću (1992)
 Književnost i javna reč (1994)
 Kritičke rasprave (1995)
 Jevrejski pisci u srpskoj književnosti (1998)
 Istorija srpskog PEN—a (2006)

Editor
 Twenty five books in the series titled Serbian literary criticism, Matica Srpska
 Knjiga srpske fantastike XII—XX veka, Serbian Literary Guild (1989)
 Srpski simbolizam, Serbian Academy of Sciences and Arts (1983)
 Srpska fantastika, SANU (1987)
 Tradicija i moderno društvo, SANU (1987)
 Odgovornost nauke i inteligencije, SANU (1990)
 Srpska književnost u emigraciji, SANU (1991)
 O Jovanu Dučiću — povodom pedesetogodišnjice smrti, SANU (1996)

References

External links
 SANU profile

1930 births
2014 deaths
Writers from Sarajevo
Serbs of Bosnia and Herzegovina
Serbian writers
Academic staff of the University of Belgrade
20th-century Serbian historians
Members of the Serbian Academy of Sciences and Arts
University of Belgrade Faculty of Philology alumni